The Price is a 2017 American drama film written and directed by Anthony Onah. The film stars Aml Ameen, Lucy Griffiths, Peter Vack, Michael Hyatt,Souléymane Sy Savané, Craig muMs Grant, and Bill Sage.

The Price premiered in the Narrative Feature Competition at the 2017 South by Southwest Film Festival. Orion Pictures and Samuel Goldwyn Films released the film theatrically on November 10, 2017.

Cast  
Aml Ameen as Seyi Ogunde
Lucy Griffiths as Liz Sloane
Peter Vack as Alex Mueller
Michael Hyatt as Ife Ogunde
Hope Olaide Wilson as Funmi Ogunde
Souléymane Sy Savané as Akin Ogunde
Craig muMs Grant as Iji Upla
Bill Sage as John Kocher

Release
The film premiered on March 13, 2017 at the South by Southwest Film Festival, where it competed for the Grand Jury Award. Orion Pictures and Samuel Goldwyn Films subsequently acquired theatrical distribution rights to the film, and they released it on November 10, 2017.

Reception
The Price was released to positive reviews from critics. Dennis Harvey, in his review for Variety, says the film is "a thoughtfully crafted, elegant-looking indie drama that suggests a bright future for Onah" and "a first feature so assured on nearly all levels."

Glenn Kenny of RogerEbert.com praised the directing and writing, saying The Price is "brisk and coherent" and a "sharply observed film," giving it 3 out of 4 stars.

Joshua Starnes of ComingSoon.net called The Price "by far the best surprise of the small indie films" at the 2017 South by Southwest Film Festival, adding: "Pointed without ever falling into stereotypes, it’s a bold statement about modern immigrant life in America and not to be missed"

Rob Staeger, in his positive review for LA Weekly, writes that Onah puts his lead at "the center of a sharply drawn world, from the fearful racism he encounters on the streets to his struggles to please and/or ignore his mom (the excellent Michael Hyatt). Ameen holds that world together with his grounded presence, a driven young man struggling to calibrate his moral compass in the face of intense pressure."

On review-aggregator website Rotten Tomatoes, the film has an approval rating of 83% with an average rating of 6.4/10. On Metacritic, the film has a score of 61 out of 100 indicating "generally favorable reviews".

Accolades

References

External links
 
 

2017 films
2017 drama films
American drama films
American independent films
Films about immigration to the United States
Films set in New York City
Films shot in New York City
Films shot in Nigeria
Orion Pictures films
Samuel Goldwyn Films films
2017 directorial debut films
2017 independent films
2010s English-language films
2010s American films